David Gans (‎1541–1613), also known as Rabbi Dovid Solomon Ganz, was a Jewish chronicler, mathematician, historian, astronomer and astrologer. He is the author of "Tzemach David" (1592) and therefore also known by this title, the צמח דוד.

Biography
David was born in Lippstadt, in what is now North Rhine-Westphalia, Germany. His father, Shlomo, was a moneylender. He studied rabbinical literature in Bonn and Frankfurt am Main, then in Kraków under Moses Isserles.

Later he attended the lectures of the Maharal of Prague and of his brother, Rabbi Sinai. They introduced philosophy, mathematics, and astronomy into the circle of their studies, and from them Gans received the impulse to devote himself to these branches of science. He lived for a time in Nordheim (where he studied Euclid), passed several years in his native city of Lippstadt, and then in about 1564 settled in Prague. There he came into contact with Kepler and Tycho Brahe, and took part for three consecutive days in astronomical observations at the Prague observatory. He was charged with the translation of the Alfonsine Tables from Hebrew into German by Tycho Brahe.

His grave in the Old Jewish Cemetery in Prague is marked with a Star of David and a goose (gans means goose in Yiddish).  The star of David, in Hebrew called a "Magen David", alludes to his work titled Magen David.

Writings
Among Gans's works the most widely known is his history entitled Tzemach David, published first in Prague in 1592. It is divided into two parts, the first containing the annals of Jewish history, the second those of general history. The author consulted the writings of Cyriacus Spangenberg, Laurentius Faustus, Hubertus Holtzius, Georg Cassino, and Martin Borisk for the second part of his work. Gans's annals are memorable as the first work of this kind among the German Jews. In his preface to the second volume the author tries to justify writing about a "profane" subject like general history, and demonstrated that it was permitted to read history on Shabbat. Tzemach David was published in many editions. To the 1692 edition published in Frankfurt, David ben Moses Rheindorf added a third part containing the annals of that century, which addition has been retained in later editions of the Tzemach. The first part of Gans's work, and extracts from the second, were translated into Latin by Wilhelm Heinrich Vorst (Leyden, 1644). It was translated also into Yiddish by Solomon Hanau (Frankfurt, 1692).

Gans was also the author of: Gebulat ha-Eretz, a work on cosmography, which is in all probability identical to the Zurat ha-Eretz, published in Constantinople under the name of "David Avazi" ("avaz" means "goose" in Hebrew, a reference to the surname "Gans", which means "goose" in Yiddish); Magen David, an astronomical treatise, a part of which is included in the Nechmad ve'naim mentioned below; the mathematical works Ma'or ha-Ḳatan, Migdal David, and Prozdor, which are no longer in existence; Nechmad ve'naim dealing with astronomy and mathematical geography, published with additions by Joel ben Jekuthiel of Glogau at Jessnitz, 1743. This work is divided into 12 chapters and 305 paragraphs. In the introduction the author gives a historical survey of the development of astronomy and mathematical geography among the nations. Although acquainted with the work of Copernicus, Gans followed the Ptolemaic system, attributing the Copernican system to the Pythagoreans. He also ventures to assert that the prophet Daniel made a mistake in computation. A Latin translation of the introduction, and a résumé made by Hebenstreit, are appended to the Nechmad ve'naim.

See also
Judah Loew ben Bezalel

Reference notes

External links

Jewish Encyclopedia: "Gans, David ben Solomon ben Seligman" by Joseph Jacobs & Isaac Broydé (1906).
Zemach David:A Chronicle of Jewish and World History

1541 births
1613 deaths
People from Lippstadt
16th-century German Jews
16th-century astrologers
16th-century Bohemian people
16th-century geographers
Czech astronomers
Czech geographers
16th-century Bohemian historians
Czech mathematicians
German astrologers
16th-century German astronomers
German expatriates in Poland
German expatriates in the Czech lands
16th-century German mathematicians
Jewish astrologers
Jewish historians
Jewish scientists
Writers from Prague
Hebrew-language chronicles
16th-century male writers
Jewish astronomers
17th-century German astronomers
17th-century Bohemian historians